The New York State Conservationist is a bimonthly, ad-free magazine published by New York's Department of Environmental Conservation (DEC). The magazine was founded in 1946 by Clayton B. Seagears, who was the Director of Conservation Education for what was then the New York State Conservation Department. 

It carries articles on environmental and conservation issues around the state DEC is involved with, plus outdoor recreation opportunities on DEC land.

The magazine bills itself as "New York's Premiere Outdoor Magazine: Bringing Nature to Your Door." It enjoys the reputation as being one of the oldest continually produced outdoor publications in this country.

See also
Eastern Cougar

References

External links
 Official website

Bimonthly magazines published in the United States
Advertising-free magazines
Environmental magazines
Publications of state governments of the United States
Magazines established in 1945
Magazines published in New York (state)